Divided City is a 2004 action-crime film written and directed by Bruce Brown, and stars Sheila Hayes, Kimberly Person, Tim Taylor, Raymond Daniels, and Big G. The music is by composer Boris Elkis.

Cast
Sheila Hayes
Kimberly Person
Tim Taylor
Raymond Daniels
Big G
David Jason Orr
Adrienne Renee Fairley
Mark Hyde
Jason Perkins
Walter Suarez Jr.
Giovanna Williams

See also 
 List of hood films

References

External links
Review at The New York Times
Review at Variety
Bruce Brown filmography

2004 films
2004 action films
African-American action films
American coming-of-age films
American independent films
Films about African-American organized crime
Films about drugs
Films set in Washington, D.C.
Films shot in Washington, D.C.
Go-go
Hood films
2000s English-language films
2000s American films